Chuburkhinji Saint George Church is a church in the village of Chuburkhindji (Tchuburkhinji), Gali Municipality, Autonomous Republic of Abkhazia, Georgia.

History 
The church was built in the 19th century. The original building was built in the 11th century, but in the second half of the 19th century, with the parish's initiative, the church was reconstructed and consecrated in the name of Saint Elijah the Prophet. But the local population still call it the Saint George church. When observing the façade of the church, it's easy to notice certain elements that characterize the 11th century Georgian architecture.

External links
 Chuburkhinji Saint George Church Historical monuments of Abkhazia — Government of the Autonomous Republic of Abkhazia.

References 

Churches in Abkhazia
Abkhazian Orthodox churches
Immovable Cultural Monuments of National Significance of Georgia